Edward Wyllys Andrews IV (December 11, 1916 – July 3, 1971) was an American archaeologist noted for research of Maya civilization. During his career with Tulane University's Middle American Research Institute, Andrews focused on Mayan ruins, rediscovering several sites and leading investigation into Balankanche, Kulubá, Coba, and more.

Early life 
From his childhood Andrews collected geological and paleontological artifacts and developed his interest in Maya culture in his teens. His grandfather and great-grandfather were noted medical doctors in Chicago, Illinois and his father was also born in Chicago.

At the age of 15 he began in the archaeology in Mesa Verde in an archaeological excavation with Byron Cummings.

Education 
In 1933 he enrolled at the University of Chicago where he worked at the Field Museum on the subject of Maya hieroglyphics and herpetology. He accompanied Sylvanus G. Morley to Chichen Itza, Yucatan.

He enrolled at Harvard University where he earned his doctorate in 1942. By the age of 21, he had published five scientific papers, mainly on Maya hieroglyphics.

During World War II, Andrews served in the United States Navy and after the war joined the Central Intelligence Agency.

Career 
After the war, Andrews returned to his archaeological duties at the Mesoamerican Research Institute at Tulane University. For the academic year 1950–1951 he was a Guggenheim Fellow. Andrews devoted the last 40 years of his life to the study of the Mayan civilization, dedicating particular focus on the north of the peninsula as in Dzibilchaltún site that he had already visited before the war. He was first to conjecture that this archaeological site was a large Mayan urban center and not a set of sites in a large archaeological area as originally thought.

Research and Discoveries 
Andrews worked on several Maya sites including:
 Dzibilchaltún
 Balankanche
 Kulubá
 Coba

Legacy 
Andrews died in New Orleans on July 3, 1971. His son, E. Wyllys Andrews V served as director of the Middle American Research Institute at Tulane, from 1975 until 2009 and continued as an emeritus professor.

References 

1916 births
1971 deaths
20th-century archaeologists
Mesoamerican archaeologists
Tulane University faculty
University of Chicago alumni
Harvard University alumni
United States Navy personnel of World War II
People of the Central Intelligence Agency